Noah's Ark is a 1928 American epic romantic melodramatic disaster film directed by Michael Curtiz and starring Dolores Costello and George O'Brien. The story is by Darryl F. Zanuck. The film was released by the Warner Bros. studio. It is representative of the transition from silent movies to "talkies", although it is essentially a hybrid film known as a part-talkie, which used the new Vitaphone sound-on-disc system. Most scenes are silent with a synchronized music score and sound effects, in particular the biblical ones, while some scenes have dialogue.

Plot
After the Great Flood, Noah and his family are seen outside of the Ark praising the Lord, followed by depictions of the building of the Tower of Babel, the worshipping of the golden calf, and then the eve of World War I, where a bankrupted trader shoots his uncaring stockbroker.

In 1914, American playboy Travis and his New York taxi driver buddy Al are traveling aboard the "Oriental Express" train. Travis helps a pious minister reclaim his seat from a rude fellow passenger. A washed-out bridge causes a deadly derailment. Travis and Al rescue Marie, a German member of a small theatrical troupe, with the help of a prisoner who unhandcuffed himself from a now-dead escort.

At the nearby lodge where they take shelter, fellow survivor Nickoloff, an officer in the Russian Secret Service, tries to sneak into Marie's room. When Travis objects, a fight breaks out, during which Nickoloff is cut on the hand by a bottle he was wielding. They are interrupted by French soldiers, who announce that war has broken out. Travis, Al and Marie sneak away in the confusion and head to Paris together. Travis and Marie fall in love.

When America enters the war, Al enlists as soon as he can. Travis tells him he cannot, as he has married Marie. However, when he later sees Al marching with his unit down the streets of Paris, he impulsively joins up as well. He loses touch with his wife.

Travis and Al meet by chance in the trenches. They are each assigned a squad to attack a machine gun nest holding up the American offensive. Tragically, Travis tosses a hand grenade into the position, not knowing that Al had captured it moments before. Al is fatally wounded, but lives long enough to bid his friend adieu.

Nickoloff spots Marie in a group of dancers entertaining the troops. He threatens to have her arrested as a German spy unless she meets him later. When she tries to sneak away, he carries through his threat, and she is sentenced to face a firing squad. She is comforted by the minister from the train. Travis, who by chance is part of the squad, recognizes her in the nick of time. The couple and others are trapped below a demolished building by a German artillery barrage. The minister compares the war and its flood of blood to the biblical story of Noah's Ark.

The film reverts to that time, with the actors playing second roles. King Nephilim has converted his subjects into worshippers of the god Jaghuth. Only Noah and his family remain faithful to Jehovah. Following Jehovah's command, Noah and his three sons begin building the Ark on a mountainside.

Nephilim orders the sacrifice of the most beautiful virgin in his realm to his god in a month. His soldiers choose Miriam, a handmaiden of Noah's. When Noah's son Japheth tries to save her, he is blinded and set to labor turning a stone-mill with other prisoners. Just as Miriam is about to be slain, Jehovah unleashes his wrath, with the great flood destroying and drowning everything in its path. Among the chaos, Japheth, freed from his chains, finds and carries Miriam back to the Ark, where Jehovah restores his sight. Nephilim tries to climb aboard the Ark, only to have the door slam on his hand, inflicting the same injuries Nickoloff suffered.

Returning to World War I, the trapped group is freed. Soon after they emerge, they learn that the Armistice has been signed and the war is over.

Cast

 Dolores Costello as Marie / Miriam
 George O'Brien as Travis / Japheth
 Noah Beery as Nickoloff / King Nephilim
 Louise Fazenda as Hilda / Tavern Maid
 Guinn 'Big Boy' Williams as Al / Ham
 Paul McAllister as Minister / Noah
 Myrna Loy as Dancer / Slave Girl
 Anders Randolf as The German / Leader of soldiers
 Armand Kaliz as The Frenchman / Leader of the King's Guard
 William V. Mong as Innkeeper / Guard
 Malcolm Waite as The Balkan / Shem
 Nigel De Brulier as Soldier / High Priest
 Noble Johnson as Slave broker
 Otto Hoffman as Trader

Cast notes
 John Wayne, Andy Devine and Ward Bond were among the hundreds of extras in the flood scene. Wayne also worked in the prop department for the film.

Songs
 "Heart o' Mine" - music by Louis Silvers, lyrics by Billy Rose
 "Old Timer" - music by Louis Silvers, lyrics by Billy Rose

Production
7,500 extras worked on the film. Dolores Costello caught a severe case of pneumonia. Thirty-five ambulances attended the wounded.

Portions of the movie were filmed at the Iverson Movie Ranch in Chatsworth, California, and the location was incorporated into an iconic special effects shot that opens the film. The shot depicts the massive ark "beached" on the giant boulders of the movie ranch's Garden of the Gods, which later would become famous for appearances in hundreds of movies including John Ford's Stagecoach (1939).

Release and re-release

The film premiered in Hollywood in late 1928, with a running time of 135 minutes.  Originally, it had been planned as a silent film in 1926 for potential release in 1927, but a number of talking sequences were added. (These were directed not by Michael Curtiz but by Roy Del Ruth.) After the premiere, Warner Bros. withdrew the film for extensive revision, which included removing about a half-hour of footage, including all the talking scenes featuring Paul McAllister, who played both a minister and Noah.  The film then opened around the country in reserved-seat engagements, after which it concluded its successful run at popular prices, even though by that time "part-talking" films like this one were considered nearly obsolete.  Although it had cost far more than any Warner Bros. film to date—over $1 million—it ultimately grossed more than twice its cost.

According to Warner Bros records the film earned $1,367,000 domestically and $938,000 foreign.

The film was re-released in 1957 by Dominant Pictures Corporation, produced by Robert Youngson as a 75-minute-long silent film, with narration added.

Reception
Alva Johnson, writing in The New Yorker, stated that it was "widely concede to be the worst picture ever made". Mordaunt Hall, writing in The New York Times, stated that "this cumbersome production, one feels that it is a great test of patience". The New York Post review of the film stated that it was "A solid bore, with a very second rate war story in which everything from The Big Parade to date has been shabbily copied".

Preservation status
The original 2 hour and 15 minute release is believed to be lost. The film has been partially restored to the length of 108 minutes (including overture and exit music) by the UCLA Film and Television Archive in conjunction with the project American Moviemakers: The Dawn of Sound.

A copy of the 1950s television release version is in the Library of Congress.

Home media
The film was released in laserdisc format in October 1993 from MGM/UA Home Video. A DVD version of the restored film was released in 2011 and is available from the Warner Archive Collection.

See also
 John Wayne filmography
 Accidents while performing a stunt
 List of incomplete or partially lost films
 List of early Warner Bros. talking features

References

Works cited

External links

 
 
 
 
 Noah's Ark at Virtual History
 The Old Testament on Film at Codex@BiblicalStudies.com 
 The Transition from Silent to Sound at The American Widescreen Museum website

1929 films
1920s war drama films
American black-and-white films
American disaster films
American war epic films
American war drama films
Films scored by Louis Silvers
Films directed by Michael Curtiz
Noah's Ark in film
Transitional sound films
Warner Bros. films
Western Front films
American World War I films
Cultural depictions of Noah
1920s disaster films
1928 drama films
1928 films
1929 drama films
Early sound films
1920s English-language films
Films shot in Los Angeles
1920s American films